Bernard Rajzman (born April 25, 1957) is a former Brazilian volleyball player. He was born in Rio de Janeiro. He was enshrined in the Volleyball Hall of Fame in 2005. Nowadays, Bernard is a member of the International Olympic Committee (IOC).

Rajzman began his sports career at the age of 11, playing basketball for Fluminense, but traded the sport for volleyball because he was too short. At the age of 17 he entered the Brazil men's national volleyball team, for which  he played in three Olympics, winning a silver medal in Los Angeles 1984. He also won seven South American Championships, one gold medal at the 1983 Pan-American Games, silver in the 1982 FIVB Men's World Championship and bronze in the 1981 Volleyball World Cup. He developed the "Star Trek" serve, adapted from the beach volleyball, in which the ball is hit from below with enough force that it sails dozens of feet over the court.

Rajzman is the president of Brazil's National Commission of Athletes, and a state congressman.

Bernard Rajzman became an IOC member at the 125th IOC Session in Buenos Aires in September 2013.

He is the father of professional surfer Phil Rajzman and Bianca Rajzman.

See also
 List of select Jewish volleyball players

References

External links

 Official website
 Volleyball Hall of Fame – Bernard

1957 births
Living people
Brazilian Jews
Brazilian people of German-Jewish descent
Brazilian men's volleyball players
Volleyball players at the 1976 Summer Olympics
Volleyball players at the 1980 Summer Olympics
Volleyball players at the 1984 Summer Olympics
Olympic volleyball players of Brazil
Olympic silver medalists for Brazil
Olympic medalists in volleyball
Volleyball players from Rio de Janeiro (city)
Jewish volleyball players
International Olympic Committee members
Medalists at the 1984 Summer Olympics